Erse or Earse may refer to:

An alternative name for any Goidelic language, especially the Irish language, from Erische
A 16th–19th-century Scots language name for Scottish Gaelic
 Aue and Erse, tributaries of the Fuhse

See also
 Erase (disambiguation)
 ERS (disambiguation)